George H. Ross (born January 6, 1928) is a former executive vice president and senior counsel of the Trump Organization. He is perhaps best known as one of Donald Trump's two advisors on the NBC reality television program The Apprentice, along with Carolyn Kepcher. On the program, Ross monitored the progress of the contestants and assisted Trump in determining who should be "fired."

Early life and education
Ross was born to a Jewish family in Brooklyn, New York and raised in the Bronx. His father died when he was 16. Ross went to Stuyvesant High School and afterward,  joined the U.S. Army as a cryptanalyst for one year. He earned a Bachelor of Arts degree from Brooklyn College before earning a Juris Doctor from Brooklyn Law School.

Career 
He was admitted to the New York State Bar Association in 1953. After he passed the bar, he worked in the litigation department for Dreyer & Traub. In 1954, he became the in-house counsel for Goldman-DiLorenzo (founded by Sol Goldman and Alex DiLorenzo). Between 2000 and 2005 Ross was in the supervisory council (Aufsichtsrat) of TD Trump Deutschland, planning to purchase or build a Trump Tower in Germany.

He teaches courses in negotiation and real estate transactions at New York University. He is the author of two books, Trump Strategies For Real Estate and Trump Style Negotiation.

Personal life
As of 2004, Ross lives in Hewlett Harbor, and is married to Billie Ross; they have two children: Nanci and Stephanie.

References

External links

1928 births
Living people
21st-century American businesspeople
20th-century American Jews
Clemson University alumni
New York (state) lawyers
Television personalities from New York City
Brooklyn College alumni
Brooklyn Law School alumni
The Trump Organization employees
20th-century American businesspeople
Writers from Brooklyn
American business writers
New York University faculty
American real estate businesspeople
People from The Five Towns, New York
21st-century American Jews
Stuyvesant High School alumni